Jess Hays Dickinson (born March 25, 1947) is the former Presiding Justice of the Supreme Court of Mississippi.

Biography

Early life
Jess Hays Dickinson was born in Charleston, Mississippi. His mother was Laura Augusta Hays (1920–2008). He has a brother, Leonard Lee Dickinson III.

He earned a Bachelor's degree from Mississippi State University in 1978, and a Juris Doctor from the University of Mississippi School of Law in 1982.

Career
He practiced law in Jackson and Gulfport before serving as a Forrest Circuit Court Judge.  He joined the Supreme Court in January 2004. He has been a member of the adjunct faculty of both William Carey College and the Mississippi College School of Law, as well as serving on two committees for the Mississippi Bar. Dickinson is a charter member of the Mississippi Access to Justice Commission.

Personal life
He is married and has four sons. Dickinson is an accomplished musician and skilled in over 30 instruments, and he is currently a member of the local Mississippi bluegrass and folk band "Bluegrass Appeal."

See also
List of justices of the Supreme Court of Mississippi

References

Living people
1947 births
Mississippi State University alumni
University of Mississippi alumni
Justices of the Mississippi Supreme Court
Mississippi College School of Law faculty
People from Charleston, Mississippi